"What You Know" is a song by Southern hip hop recording artist T.I., released as the lead single from his fourth studio album King (2006). The song peaked at number three on the Billboard Hot 100 and was certified double platinum by the RIAA following shipment in excess of two million copies.

Background
The song is produced by T.I.'s frequent collaborator DJ Toomp, from Zone Boy Productions, with additional keys by Wonder Arillo. It utilizes an interpolation of Roberta Flack's version of The Impressions's "Gone Away" and of the song "Hey Joe", written by Billy Roberts but popularized by Jimi Hendrix.

Composition 
The song is in E minor.

Chart performance
"What You Know" peaked at number three on the US Billboard Hot 100 chart. It also peaked at number one on the Hot R&B/Hip-Hop Songs and Hot Rap Songs charts. It spent a total of 20 weeks on the Hot 100 chart. On December 14, 2006, the song was certified double platinum by the Recording Industry Association of America (RIAA) for sales of over two million copies in the United States.

Remixes
American rappers Juelz Santana and J.R Writer, of Dipset, recorded a remix of this song entitled "What You Know (About That Crack)". American rapper Papoose recorded a freestyle over the song entitled "What You Know (About Pap)". American rapper Lil Wayne also recorded a remix of "What You Know", which can be found on his mixtape Dedication 2.

Accolades
"What You Know" won for "Best Rap Solo Performance" and was nominated for "Best Rap Song" at the 49th Annual Grammy Awards.
"What You Know" was performed at the 2006 MTV Video Music Awards, where its music video was nominated for two awards.
VIBE named T.I.'s "What You Know" as the Top Song of 2006. It was also ranked fourth on a similar list by Rolling Stone , and was number 1 in Muchmusic's Top HipHop 2006 List.
Pitchfork Media ranked "What You Know" number 3 on their "Top Tracks of 2006" list, while T.I.'s collaboration on Justin Timberlake's song "My Love" was ranked number 1.
The song is one of the most critically acclaimed of 2006 (arguably T.I.'s most critically acclaimed song), and is one of T.I.'s most successful. It has garnered a 5-star rating from Pitchfork Media. The song peaked at number three on the Billboard Hot 100, and it also topped the Hot R&B/Hip-Hop Songs chart. It is ranked the 338th best song of all time, 8th of 2006, and 42nd of the 2000s decade by Acclaimedmusic.net.
In 2008, it was ranked number 68 on VH1's 100 Greatest Songs of Hip Hop.
In 2007, "What You Know" was named the second-best single of 2006 on The Village Voices Pazz & Jop annual critics' poll, after Gnarls Barkleys "Crazy".

In popular culture
The song was used in promotion of the film ATL, in which T.I. stars.
Japanese professional wrestler KENTA used an instrumental of the song as his entrance theme.
The song was the at-bat music for MLB player Joe Mauer.
The song was used as the entrance song for Kendall Grove at UFC 101.
The song was used at Turner Field whenever Édgar Rentería came up to bat during the 2006 season.
The song is used at the beginning of Rich Turpin's "Whatcha Know?" segment on BT Sports Radio.

Charts

Weekly charts

Year-end charts

Certifications

References

2006 singles
T.I. songs
Grammy Award for Best Rap Solo Performance
Grand Hustle Records singles
Atlantic Records singles
Music videos directed by Chris Robinson (director)
Songs written for films
Song recordings produced by DJ Toomp
Songs written by T.I.
Songs written by Curtis Mayfield
Songs written by DJ Toomp
Songs written by Leroy Hutson
Southern hip hop songs
Trap music songs
2006 songs